Alges Maasikmets (born 18 August 1968) is an Estonian cyclist. He competed in the men's cross-country mountain biking event at the 1996 Summer Olympics.

References

External links
 
 
 

1968 births
Living people
Estonian male cyclists
Olympic cyclists of Estonia
Cyclists at the 1996 Summer Olympics
Sportspeople from Tallinn